Mohammad Imran (born 26 April 1989) is a Pakistani cricketer. He made his first-class debut for Sialkot in the 2007–08 Quaid-e-Azam Trophy on 25 November 2007.

References

External links
 

1989 births
Living people
Pakistani cricketers
National Bank of Pakistan cricketers
Sialkot cricketers
Sui Northern Gas Pipelines Limited cricketers
Cricketers from Sialkot